Asadabad (also Romanized as Asadābād; also known as Cheqā-ye Sabz and Chigha yi Sabz) is a village in Suri Rural District, Suri District, Rumeshkhan County, Lorestan Province, Iran. It lies between the villages of Chogha Sabz-e Khoda Nazar to the north-west and Sefid Khani-ye Jadid to the southeast. At the 2006 census, its population was 897, in 180 families.

References 

Populated places in Rumeshkhan County